Roger I. Nokes (born 13 August 1958) is a professor of civil and natural resources engineering at the University of Canterbury, New Zealand, specialising in fluid mechanics and is also a chess master. 
Nokes is a university council member, was head of the Department of Civil and Natural Resources Engineering between 2009 and 2012 (coinciding with the 2010 and 2011 Canterbury Earthquakes) and has achieved a number of teaching awards. Nokes is a member of the Royal Society of New Zealand.

Teaching awards
 1993 – University of Auckland University Teaching Medal
 2001 – UCSA Best Lecturer at the University of Canterbury
 2003 – University of Canterbury University Teaching Award
 2006 – National Tertiary Teaching Excellence Award
 2008 – UCSA Best Lecturer at the University of Canterbury

Chess career
In 1980 Nokes was joint New Zealand Chess Champion with Ortvin Sarapu and Vernon Small and represented New Zealand at the Chess Olympiad in 1982, 2004, 2006, and 2008. He is a FIDE Master.

Notes

External links
Prof. Roger Nokes - University of Canterbury Staff Profile

1958 births
Living people
New Zealand chess players
Academic staff of the University of Canterbury
Chess Olympiad competitors
Chess FIDE Masters